James Jones ( 1930) was a New Zealand rugby league player.

A loose forward, Jones played for South Auckland provincially. He was a member of the Huntly club.

He toured Australia in 1930 with the New Zealand national side, a tour where no test matches were played.

References 

New Zealand rugby league players
Waikato rugby league team players
New Zealand national rugby league team players
Rugby league locks

20th-century New Zealand people
Year of birth missing

Year of death missing